Peter Jaquett (17551834) was a United States officer who fought in the American Revolutionary War.

Revolutionary War

Peter Jaquett joined the 1st Delaware Regiment of the Continental Army on January 4, 1776 and served until April, 1780. He fought in every military engagement under Washington which took place in Delaware, Pennsylvania, New Jersey, New York, and the Eastern States. Jaquett was then ordered to join the Southern Army under General Horatio Gates; and he was in the Battle of Camden (August 16, 1780), in which the Delaware Regiment, consisting of eight companies, was reduced to two companies of ninety-six men each. The two surviving commands were led by Captain Robert Kirkwood and himself, as the oldest surviving officers. He also served in the Battle of Guilford Court House, the Second Battle of Camden and the Battle of Eutaw Springs. He assisted in the Siege of Ninety-Six and capture of the village of that name, and was also in every action and skirmish under General Nathanael Green, in whose army he remained until the capture of Lord Cornwallis at Yorktown.

Personal life

Jaquett was born April 6, 1755 to Peter Jaquett (1718-1772) and his wife Elizabeth (1729-1801). After his career as a soldier, Jaquett returned to Delaware in 1782 and married Elizabeth (Eliza) Price of Chester, Pennsylvania in 1794. He spent his remaining years as a farmer on his parental estate, Long Hook Farm, just south of Wilmington, Delaware. Jaquett died September 13, 1834 and is buried at Old Swedes Episcopal Church Cemetery.

Legacy 

The Major Peter Jaquett Chapter of the Delaware Society of the Sons of the American Revolution is named for Jaquett.

See also 
Major Robert Kirkwood

References

External links
18th Century Battle Buddies: Robert Kirkwood and Peter Jaquett, Delaware Military Museum

The Historical Marker Database file for Major Peter Jaquett
Sons of the American Revolution patriot file for Peter Jaquett
Society of the Cincinnati
American Revolution Institute
1st Delaware Regiment, historical reenactment group

1755 births
1844 deaths
Continental Army officers from Delaware
People of colonial Delaware